Hebri is a town and taluk headquarters in the Udupi district of Karnataka, at the foot of the Western Ghats of India in Karnataka state. It was first inaugurated as a taluk in 2018. It is a main junction and a central point of roads leading to Mangalore, Brahmavar, Karkala, Kundapura, Agumbe and Udupi.  The area's forests receive high rainfall throughout the year. Someshwara Wildlife Sanctuary is located nearby, which covers the entire route till Agumbe and the western Ghats. The sanctuary houses a number of endangered species including the King Cobra.

The local languages are  Tulu and Kundagannada.

Economy 
The economy of Hebri is mainly dependent on agriculture, including rice (paddy), areca nut, coconut, and cashew nut. Nowadays rubber is also grown on foothills of the western ghats. In and around Hebri are many factories which process cashew nuts, coconuts, and rice, particularly parboiled rice. Hebri has a number schools, colleges, a Public Health Centre (PHC), and a petrol pump.

References 

https://villageinfo.in/karnataka/udupi/karkal/hebri.html

Villages in Udupi district